"Who the Hell Are You" is a song by Australian house music band Madison Avenue, released as the second single from their only studio album, The Polyester Embassy (2000). The song was released in Australia on 5 June 2000 and was given a UK release on 9 October 2000. In the United States, the single was serviced to rhythmic contemporary radio in January 2001. The song contains elements from Vernon Burch's 1979 song "Get Up".

"Who the Hell Are You" was a hit in the band's native Australia, debuting and peaking at number one on the ARIA Singles Chart for two weeks and winning the 2000 ARIA Music Award for Best Video. Later in the year, the song reached number 10 in the United Kingdom, number 32 in New Zealand, and number 41 in Ireland. In March 2001, it topped the US Billboard Hot Dance Music/Club Play chart for a week. The Mark Hartley directed music video won the ARIA Award for Best Video at the ARIA Music Awards of 2000.

Track listings

Australian CD single
 "Who the Hell Are You" (original mix – edit) – 3:30
 "Who the Hell Are You" (John Course & Andy Van remix) – 7:25
 "Don't Call Me Baby" (Madison Babe from Outer Space remix) – 9:30
 "Who the Hell Are You" (original 12-inch mix) – 6:29

Australian 12-inch single
A. "Who the Hell Are You" (original 12-inch mix)
B. "Who the Hell Are You" (John Course vs Andy Van remix)

UK CD single
 "Who the Hell Are You" (original mix) – 6:28
 "Who the Hell Are You" (Illicit remix) – 7:10
 "Who the Hell Are You" (Ain't No Love mix) – 6:14
 "Who the Hell Are You" (video)

UK 12-inch single
A1. "Who the Hell Are You" (Illicit remix) – 7:10
B1. "Who the Hell Are You" (Ain't No Love mix) – 6:14
B2. "Who the Hell Are You" (John Course vs Andy Van remix) – 6:26

UK cassette single
 "Who the Hell Are You" (original mix) – 6:28
 "Who the Hell Are You" (Illicit remix) – 7:10
 "Who the Hell Are You" (Ain't No Love mix) – 6:14

European CD single
 "Who the Hell Are You" (Illicit mix edit) – 3:30
 "Who the Hell Are You" (original mix edit) – 3:28

Charts and certifications

Weekly charts

Year-end charts

Certifications

Release history

See also
 List of number-one singles in Australia in 2000
 List of number-one dance singles of 2001 (U.S.)

Notes

References

2000 singles
2000 songs
ARIA Award-winning songs
Columbia Records singles
Hut Records singles
Madison Avenue (band) songs
Number-one singles in Australia
Songs written by Andy Van Dorsselaer
Songs written by Cheyne Coates